Susanne Vandegrift Moore (May 15, 1848 - 1926) was an American editor and publisher. During the period of 1889–97, she was the editor and owner of the weekly, St. Louis Life. She was friends with Kate Chopin. Susanne Moore died in 1926.

Biography
Susanne ("Sue") Vandegrift Moore born in Bucks County, Pennsylvania, May 15, 1848. 

She was educated in a female seminary in Philadelphia, Pennsylvania.

She taught for several years after graduation in private and public schools. In 1877, she married, and with her husband, moved to St. Louis, Missouri. She became a regular contributor to the St. Louis Spectator and contributed to the woman's department of the New York World. Thrown upon her own resources, she began in 1889 the publication of an illustrated weekly journal, St. Louis Life, of which she was editor and owner. The venture was successful, providing for a comfortable income. She died in Jacksonville, Florida, 1926, and was buried in that city's Evergreen Cemetery.

References

Attribution

Bibliography

External links
 
 

1848 births
1926 deaths
19th-century American writers
19th-century American women writers
19th-century American newspaper editors
19th-century American newspaper publishers (people)
Writers from Pennsylvania
People from Bucks County, Pennsylvania
Women newspaper editors
American women non-fiction writers
Wikipedia articles incorporating text from A Woman of the Century